Alesia was the capital of the Mandubii, one of the Gallic tribes allied with the Aedui. The Celtic oppidum was conquered by Julius Caesar during the Gallic Wars and afterwards became a Gallo-Roman town. Modern understanding of its location was controversial for a long time; however, it is now thought to have been located on Mont-Auxois, near Alise-Sainte-Reine in Burgundy, France.

History

Battle of Alesia

Alesia is best known for being the site of the decisive Battle of Alesia in 52 BC that marked the defeat of the Gauls under Vercingetorix by the Romans under Julius Caesar. Caesar described the battle in detail in his Commentarii de Bello Gallico (Book VII, 69–90). The battle's outcome determined the fate of all of Gaul: in winning the battle, the Romans won both the Gallic Wars and dominion over Gaul.

Roman vicus
After being conquered by Caesar, Alesia became a Gallo-Roman town. It featured a town centre with monumental buildings such as temples and a forum. There was also a theatre.

Geography and location
For a long time after the abandonment of the Roman town, the location of Alesia and thus the site of the important battle was unknown and subject to speculation. In the 19th century, Emperor Napoleon III developed an interest in the location of this crucial battle in pre-French history. He was writing a biography of Caesar and saw the command of Vercingetorix over all Gaulish armies as a symbol of the French nation. At the same time he realized that the future French nation was heavily influenced by the Roman victory and centuries of rule over Gaul.

In 1838 an inscription IN ALISIIA was discovered near Alise-Sainte-Reine in the department Côte-d'Or near Dijon. Napoleon ordered an archaeological excavation by  around Mont-Auxois. These excavations from 1861 to 1865 concentrated on the vast Roman siege lines and indicated that the historical Alesia was indeed located there.

It was protected by a wall (murus gallicus) enclosing an area of up to 140 hectares, pierced by at least two pincer gates and in 52 BC it possibly had a population of 80,000 including refugees and men under the command of Vercingetorix.

Later archaeological analysis at Alise-Sainte-Reine has corroborated the described siege in detail. The remains of siege rings said to match Caesar’s descriptions have been identified by archaeologists using aerial photography (e.g. by René Goguey).

Alternative theories on Alesia’s location
There have been other theories about Alesia's location that claimed it was in Franche-Comté or around Salins-les-Bains in Jura. In the 1960s, a French archaeologist, proposed that the location of Alesia is at Chaux-des-Crotenay in Franche-Comté, at the gate of the Jura mountains—a place that better suits the descriptions in Caesar's Gallic Wars—and indeed, Roman fortifications have been found at that site. In total, around 40 towns and other locations have claimed to be the site of Alesia.

Today

Part of the area has become the MuséoParc Alésia. Not much of the Gallic oppidum is visible today, except for some remains of a rampart. Most of the ruins date to the town’s Roman period.

A large copper statue of Vercingetorix, made in 1865 by Aimé Millet, stands at the western end of the plateau.

The uncertainty surrounding Alesia's location is humorously parodied in the Asterix comic book Asterix and the Chieftain's Shield, in which, in this case because of Gaulish pride, characters repeatedly and vehemently deny that they know its location: "I don't know where Alesia is! No-one knows where Alesia is!".

See also 
 Triumphal entry into Jerusalem
 Triumphal Arch of Orange

References

External links
 Museumpark at Alesia
 Siege of Alesia

1838 archaeological discoveries
Oppida
Vercingetorix
Populated places in pre-Roman Gaul
Archaeological sites in France
Roman towns and cities in Burgundy
Former populated places in France